Joseph Müller (19 August 1894 – 11 September 1944) was a German Catholic priest and critic of the Nazi regime. He was tried by the "People's Court" and executed at Brandenburg-Görden Prison.

Life
Müller was born in Salmünster, Hesse, the youngest of seven children of the local cantor and teacher Damien Müller and his wife Augusta. After obtaining his Abitur degree, he served as a volunteer in World War I, interrupted by a serious injury. After the war he resolved to become a preacher; two of his brothers also were ordained Catholic priests. He went on to study theology at the University of Münster and proceeded with his brother Oskar to the Diocese of Hildesheim. Both attended the Hildesheim seminary from 1921 and received the holy orders from Bishop Joseph Ernst in the following year.

Joseph Müller began his ecclesiastical career as a chaplain in Duderstadt. In 1924 he joined the Franciscan convent at Fulda, but later continued to work as chaplain in Gehrden, Hannoversch Münden, Celle, and Wolfenbüttel. In 1931 he was installed as a priest in Bad Lauterberg. From 1934 he served as a priest in Süpplingen, from October 1937 in Heiningen. Due to his deteriorated health, he served in the small Catholic parish of Groß Düngen from 1 August 1943 onwards.

Though of frail physical condition, Müller was known as an inspiring orator, speaking frankly to his congregation. He was devoted to spiritual guidance, especially of young workers according to the teachings of Adolph Kolping. After the Nazi seizure of power in 1933, his youth work had to cope with increasing repressions by the government authorities and his activities were monitored by the Gestapo.

According to the 2007 documentary Laughing with Hitler, Müller was arrested after repeating a political joke about a wounded soldier on his deathbed, who asked to see the people for whom he was laying down his life. The nurse laid a portrait of Hitler on his one side, and a portrait of Göring on the other. Then, he gasped: "Now I can die like Jesus Christ." Müller was interrogated and temporarily taken into custody on 6 September 1943 under charges of comparing Hitler and Göring with the two criminals crucified alongside Jesus Christ.

Although Müller was temporarily released, local Nazi officials re-arrested him on 15 May 1944 and he was deported to the Moabit remand prison in Berlin. Though he was interrogated by any methods at disposal, he did not reveal who told him the joke. He was brought to the "People's Court" and sentenced to death for Wehrkraftzersetzung by judge Roland Freisler in a show trial on 28 July 1944. Joseph Müller was executed by guillotine in Brandenburg-Görden Prison on September 11. After his death, Freisler would send Müller's family a bill for his execution.

Legacy
Since the end of World War II, each year on the anniversary of Müller's death, a bell is tolled at his former parish church in the village of Groß Düngen. His ashes were transferred to the local cemetery in November 1945.

In May 2016, the Roman Catholic Diocese of Hildesheim opened his cause of martyrdom, earning him the title Servant of God.

References

1894 births
1944 deaths
20th-century venerated Christians
German Servants of God
Executed members of the 20 July plot
Catholic resistance to Nazi Germany
People from Main-Kinzig-Kreis